Apathy is a lack of emotion, motivation, or enthusiasm, deriving from the ancient Greek term Apatheia.

Apathy may also refer to:

 Apathy (rapper), an underground rapper
 Stephan Apáthy (István Apathy, 1863–1922), Hungarian zoologist
 Apáthy, a surname
 "Apathy", a song by the industrial rock band KMFDM
 Apathy, a defunct grunge band fronted by Luke Helder
 "Apathy is a Death Wish", a song by Story of the Year
 The Apathy, a type of antagonistic monster featured in the animated web series RWBY

See also
 Apatheism, the attitude of apathy towards the existence or non-existence of God(s)